Central station (also called Central Square station) is a Massachusetts Bay Transportation Authority (MBTA) rapid transit station in Cambridge, Massachusetts. It serves the Red Line and has a street-level terminal for the MBTA bus system. It is located at the intersection of Massachusetts Avenue with Western Avenue, Prospect Street, and Magazine Street at Central Square.

The station is fully accessible, with each of the two side platforms served by an elevator.

History

After the success of the 1897-opened Tremont Street Subway, the Boston Elevated Railway (BERy) planned an elevated system with lines to Cambridge, South Boston, Charlestown, and Roxbury. The latter two lines opened in 1901 as the Charlestown Elevated and Washington Street Elevated, while the South Boston line was determined to be infeasible. After debate about running an elevated line above business districts in Cambridge, the BERy agreed in late 1906 to built a line under Beacon Hill in Boston, over a new West Boston Bridge, and under Main Street and Massachusetts Avenue in Cambridge to Harvard Square. Construction began on May 24, 1909. The Cambridge Subway opened from Harvard Square to Park Street Under on March 23, 1912, with intermediate stations at Central Square and Kendall Square. 

The platforms and floors were made of granolithic. Several original tile mosaics displaying the station name are still in place above the platforms.

On January 26, 1978, heavy rains flooded the station. In the mid-1980s, the platforms were extended at many early-built Red Line stations, allowing six-car trains to be run beginning in January 1988. The platforms at Central were extended to the northwest (contrary to original plans for the southeast) beginning on April 25, 1985, with new entrances placed west of Prospect Street. (Extension to the northwest had been previously proposed in 1927 to add the additional entrances.) The $11.2 million project was completed on March 9, 1988. As part of the Arts on the Line program, two works of public art were installed:
East Indian, by Elizabeth Mapelli, seven fused glass tile murals behind benches on the platforms
Circle Square by Anne Storrs and Dennis Cunningham, 100 ceramic tile reliefs mounted above the station columns

The MBTA agreed to replace the inbound elevator as part of the 2006 settlement of Joanne Daniels-Finegold, et al. v. MBTA. Notice to proceed was given in June 2017. The elevator was closed on April 9, 2018; due to issues with conduits and a standpipe, completion was delayed by over a year to April 2, 2020. The MBTA also plans to add two additional elevators to the station, and to replace the outbound elevator. Design was completed by May 2022.

Bus connections

Central is a major transfer station, with six MBTA bus routes running from the station to various parts of Cambridge, Somerville, Allston, and Boston.

: Harvard Square–Nubian station
: Central Square, Cambridge–Broadway station
: Oak Square station–University Park or Kendall/MIT station
: Market Place Drive or Waltham Center–University Park
: Rindge Avenue–Central Square, Cambridge
: Sullivan Square station–Central Square, Cambridge

References

External links

MBTA - Central
Google Maps Street View: Prospect Street entrances, Essex Street entrances, Pearl Street entrances

Red Line (MBTA) stations
Railway stations in the United States opened in 1912
Railway stations in Cambridge, Massachusetts
1912 establishments in Massachusetts
Railway stations located underground in Massachusetts